The Division of Hotham is an Australian Electoral Division in Victoria. It is located in the south-eastern suburbs of Melbourne. Hotham covers an area of approximately 83 square kilometres from Oakleigh in the north to Dingley Village in the south. The division includes the suburbs of Bentleigh East, Clarinda, Clayton, Clayton South, Coatesville, Huntingdale, Mulgrave, Notting Hill, Oakleigh, Oakleigh East, Oakleigh South, Waverley Park, Westall, and Wheelers Hill in their entirety; as well as parts of Bentleigh, Chadstone, Glen Waverley, Heatherton, McKinnon, Mount Waverley, Ormond, Springvale, Springvale South and Syndal.

Geography
Since 1984, federal electoral division boundaries in Australia have been determined at redistributions by a redistribution committee appointed by the Australian Electoral Commission. Redistributions occur for the boundaries of divisions in a particular state, and they occur every seven years, or sooner if a state's representation entitlement changes or when divisions of a state are malapportioned.

History

The division was created in 1969 and is named for Sir Charles Hotham, Governor of Victoria 1854–55. The division was originally created as a safe Liberal seat, replacing the abolished Division of Higinbotham. Its founding member was Don Chipp, a prominent Liberal who served as a minister under John Gorton, William McMahon and Malcolm Fraser—as well as Harold Holt and John McEwen while he held his old seat. Chipp ended up quitting the party in 1977 due to personal animosity towards Fraser to form the Australian Democrats, and shortly thereafter transferred to the Senate.

Demographic changes resulted in Chipp's Liberal successor Roger Johnston lose Hotham to Labor in 1980.  Labor has held it without serious difficulty since then, and the seat is now considered a fairly safe Labor seat. The immediate past member, Simon Crean, was Opposition Leader from 2001 until December 2003 and was in every Labor Cabinet or Shadow Cabinet from June 1991 to March 2013.  Crean retired at the 2013 election and was succeeded by fellow Labor member Clare O'Neil.

Members

Election results

References

External links
 Division of Hotham - Australian Electoral Commission

Electoral divisions of Australia
Constituencies established in 1969
1969 establishments in Australia
City of Greater Dandenong
City of Kingston (Victoria)
City of Glen Eira
City of Monash
Electoral districts and divisions of Greater Melbourne